Nartan is the name of several rural localities in Chegemsky District of the Kabardino-Balkarian Republic, Russia:
Nartan (road crossing), a road crossing
Nartan (selo), a selo